Adventure City is an amusement park in Stanton, California, United States. The Coca-Cola Company is the park's only major sponsor. The park sits right on the edge of Anaheim and Stanton. Though the park advertises itself as being within the city of Anaheim, the physical location of the park is in Stanton while the parking lot and main entrance are in Anaheim.

History
The park opened in 1994 at a cost of $4 million, as an expansion of Hobby City, a nearby  collection of novelty shops and museums. The park was initially marketed for families with children, as an affordable alternative to other amusement parks in Greater Los Angeles.   Hobby City's original miniature railroad attraction, which opened in 1938 (25 years before the park opened), was extended and incorporated into the new park. A classic 1946 carousel was also part of the park's opening day attractions roster.

In 1999, the park purchased and refurbished a classic 1950s-era Wild Mouse style rollercoaster from an amusement company in Brisbane, Australia. The park named its new roller coaster Tree Top Racers, and expanded its boundaries westward into an adjacent former parking area to incorporate its new attraction. The ride was the park's first new attraction since opening, adding to its collection of classic rides. In 2012, Tree Top Racers was permanently closed.

In 2005, the park opened Drop Zone, its second new attraction since opening day, next to Tree Top Racers. In 2015, Rewind Racers, a $2 million family shuttle coaster opened on the former site of Tree Top Racers in time for the park's 20th anniversary. The ride is a first of its kind attraction in North America, built by Gerstlauer, a German ride manufacturer, and the largest single investment in the park's history.

Attractions

Rides 
Balloon Race - Spinning balloon ride.
Barnstormer Planes - Spinning airplane ride.
Drop Zone - Opened in 2005, a drop tower ride.
Freeway Coaster - The park's first roller coaster. It was built around a giant pepper tree[8] which existed on the site before the park was built.
Crank 'n' Roll - Kid-powered 'train' ride.
Adventure City Express Train - A 14 in (356 mm) gauge[9] ridable miniature train ride built in 1938 and was a main attraction at Hobby *City for 25 years. It was incorporated into the park when the park was built in 1994.
Crazy Bus - A bus-themed flat ride
Carousel - A vintage 1946 carousel featuring 20 horse figures.
Giggle Wheel - A mini Ferris wheel.
Rewind Racers - Opened in 2015. A unique family shuttle coaster. A first of its kind in North America.
Rescue Ride - 6 individual rescue vehicles that travel around a serpentine track

Other attractions 
Stage 39 - Stage area for dance parties and live shows.
Petting farm
Thomas and Friends - An area where children can play with toys and train sets from the Thomas and Friends franchise.
Mount Adventurous - A children's rock climbing tower.
Arcade

Former attractions 
Tree Top Racers - Opened in 1999, a 1950s-era vintage Wild Mouse roller coaster. The ride closed in 2012 and was replaced in 2015 by Rewind Racers.
Childrens Theater was replaced by Stage 39

References

External links

Amusement parks in California
Orange County, California culture
1994 establishments in California
Tourist attractions in Orange County, California
Amusement parks opened in 1994
Stanton, California